Abul Mujāhid Sikandar Shāh, commonly known as Sikandar Shah; was the second Sultan of Bengal and the Ilyas Shahi dynasty. He was the son of Shamsuddin Ilyas Shah. Sikandar Shah continued to project the imperial ambitions of his father. He defeated the Sultan of Delhi in 1359. His reign is also noted for its grandiose architectural projects.

Reign

Sikandar Shah assumed the throne after the death of his father. He continued to consolidate and expand the territory of the Bengal Sultanate, which had emerged as one of the leading powers in the Indian subcontinent. The most significant event of his reign was the second invasion of Bengal by the Sultan of Delhi Firuz Shah Tughluq in 1359. The Tughlaqs declared Zafar Khan Fars, a Persian noble and son-in-law of Fakhruddin Mubarak Shah, as the legitimate ruler of Bengal. Firuz Shah Tughluq led an army consisting of 80,000 cavalry, a large infantry and 470 elephants to Bengal. Sikandar Shah took refuge in the fortress of Ekdala, in the same way his father did earlier. The Delhi forces besieged the fort. The Bengal army strongly defended their stronghold until the start of the monsoon. Eventually, Sikandar Shah and Firuz Shah reached a peace treaty, in which Delhi recognized Bengal's independence and withdrew its armed forces.

The reign of Sikandar Shah lasted for three decades. It was characterized by stability and prosperity. He constructed many grand buildings and mosques, including the Adina Mosque, which became the largest mosque in the Indian subcontinent for a long time. Other structures built during his reign were the tomb and mosque of Akhi Siraj, the Kotwali Gateway at the southern entrance of Lakhnauti, a vault at Ganagarampur, Dinajpur and a mosque at Mulla Simla, Hughli.

Known as sober and gentle, Sikandar Shah liked the association of learned persons and respected the clergy and Sufis. He continued the liberal and tolerant practices of his father.

Succession 
In 1390, one of Sikandar Shah's eighteen sons revolted and occupied Sonargaon and Satgaon. A war of succession raged. At the Battle of Goalpara, near the capital Pandua, Sikandar Shah was killed by the forces led by his son, despite his son's orders that his father, the Sultan, should not be harmed in any way. That son then assumed the throne of Bengal as Sultan Ghiyasuddin Azam Shah.

See also
List of rulers of Bengal

References

Sultans of Bengal
1390 deaths
14th-century Indian Muslims
14th-century Indian monarchs
Ilyas Shahi dynasty